Green Left, previously known as Green Left Weekly, is an Australian socialist newspaper, written by progressive activists to "present the views excluded by the big business media".  The newspaper was founded in 1990. Green Left is the de facto newspaper of the Socialist Alliance.

Overview
The newspaper is a notionally independent Australian source of local, national and international news, and provides left-wing analysis and debate.  In an editorial in the first issue, Green Left Weekly stated:

Although the newspaper was initiated by the Democratic Socialist Perspective, the newspaper has been supported by a variety of groups throughout its history.  In the early 1990s, Australian Democrats senators Sid Spindler and Janet Powell supported and sponsored the newspaper.

Subjects of particular importance to Green Left Weekly include workers rights, refugees, women's rights, global warming, environmental destruction, Australian Aboriginal land rights, and foreign policy, especially Australia's military intervention in the Asia-Pacific region, the US led invasions of Afghanistan and Iraq and other forms of US political intervention overseas.

In 2011, Victorian Consumer Affairs Minister Michael O'Brien asked the Australian Competition & Consumer Commission (ACCC) to investigate whether a number of groups, including Green Left Weekly, had breached secondary boycott laws by supporting the Boycott, Divestment and Sanctions movement pickets at the premises of the Max Brenner chain of chocolate shops. The ACCC determined that the protests were not a secondary boycott.

The newspaper strongly supports  the socialist policy of Bolivia and Ecuador and the Bolivarian Revolution in Venezuela led by Hugo Chávez, and in the past opened a bureau in Caracas to improve its coverage of events there.  At the time, it claimed to be the only Australian newspaper with a bureau in Latin America.

It is also the only Australian newspaper to regularly print articles by left-wing journalist John Pilger.  Pilger has said of Green Left Weekly: "There are few other newspapers — radical or any other kind — that draw together news and analysis that is as well informed, credible, and non-sectarian as Green Left Weekly.  Its work has influenced mine and has been a beacon to those who believe the press ought to be an agent of the people."

Since 2008, Green Left Weekly has published a monthly Arabic language supplement, The Flame, edited by Socialist Alliance members of the growing Sudanese Australian community. In 2009, Green Left Weekly launched a new Spanish language supplement, Foro Social Latinamericano, edited by the Latin America Social Forum in Sydney, a collaboration between left-wing members and groups in the Latin American community in Australia.

Green Left Weekly is routinely criticised by News Corp Australia publications in editorials and opinion pieces. The Australian accused Green Left Weekly of supporting terrorism for its criticism of Israel.

Awards
In June 2005 Green Left weekly won an award from web-surveying company Hitwise.  Hitwise ranked the website as the most popular Australian-based political site. Green Left Weekly received a similar award in 2006, and in the period between June and December 2009, Green Left weekly once again ranked in the top ten, achieving 7th position.

See also

 List of newspapers in Australia

References

External links
 
 The Flame
 Socialist Alliance website 

Alternative weekly newspapers
Eco-socialism
Environmentalism in Australia
Green politics
Left-wing politics in Australia
Newspapers published in New South Wales
Progressivism
Publications established in 1990
Weekly newspapers published in Australia
Socialist newspapers
1990 establishments in Australia